The Kimberley Dynamiters are a Junior "B" Ice Hockey team based in Kimberley, British Columbia, Canada. They are members of the Eddie Mountain Division of the Kootenay Conference of the Kootenay International Junior Hockey League (KIJHL). They play their home games at Kimberley Civic Centre.

The team began play in 1991, in the Rocky Mountain Junior Hockey League. Kimberley also had a team, the Knights, in the KIJHL between 1972 and 1989.

History

The Kimberley Dynamiters name was previously used by Kimberley's now defunct senior hockey clubs that played in the
WKHL, the ABCSL, and the WIHL between 1932 and 1981.

The Kimberley Knights won the KIJHL in 1979/80 and the same year won the Cyclone Taylor Cup. Later, as the Dynamiters, Kimberley won the Rocky Mountain Junior Hockey League championship in 1994 and 1999 as a Junior "A" team. Under head Coach Jerry Bancks who previously coached the Junior "A" team to a Rocky Mountain championship, The Dynamiters won the 2014/15 KIJHL Championship against the Kamloops Storm in a seven-game series 4 games to 2, They also placed second at the Cyclone Taylor Cup losing to the eventual Western Canadian Champions Campbell River Storm.

Captain Jason Richter was named divisional most valuable player and top scorer for division and league, Jordan Busch was named top Defenseman in the Eddie Mountain division while Coy Prevost was awarded Divisional Rookie of the year. Goaltender Tyson Brouwer was awarded the Playoff most valuable player.

Season-by-season record

Note: GP = Games played, W = Wins, L = Losses, T = Ties, OTL = Overtime Losses, Pts = Points, GF = Goals for, GA = Goals against

Records as of February 22, 2014.

Playoffs

 Notes

 The RMJHL playoffs had three rounds.
 The final 1998-99 RMJHL playoffs had two rounds.

Mowat Cup

Cyclone Taylor Cup 

 Notes

 The Kimberley Dynamiters hosted the 2008 Cyclone Taylor Cup in Kimberley, British Columbia, at the Kimberley Civic Centre.

NHL alumni

Awards and trophies

Most Sportsmanlike
 Leo Keefer: 2008-2009
 Leo Keefer: 2007-2008
 James Jowsey: 2014-2015

Top Scorer
 Tommy Latouche-Gauvin: 2007-2008
 Mike Whitequills: 2006-2007
 Chris Kostiuk: 2005-2006
 Chris Kostiuk: 2004-2005
Jason Richter: 2014-2015
Eric Buckely: 2015-2016

Most Valuable Player
 Chris Kostiuk: 2005-2006
 Chris Kostiuk: 2004-2005
 Jason Richter: 2014-2015
Tyson Brouwer: 2015-2016

Rookie of the year
 Drayson Bowman: 2004-2005
Coy Prevost: 2014-2015
George Bertoia: 2015-2016

References

External links
  Official website of the Kimberley Dynamiters

Ice hockey teams in British Columbia
1972 establishments in British Columbia
Ice hockey clubs established in 1972